Levi is a village in Tori Parish, Pärnu County in southwestern Estonia.

References

 

Villages in Pärnu County